Manakamana College is situated in Birtamode, Jhapa near the transportation office. The College's motto is Education for culture and dignity.

Course offered

Bachelor in Business Studies (BBS)
Bachelor in Education (B.Ed)
Bachelor in Arts (BA)
Bachelor in Computer Education (BCA)

Affiliation
 
This college is affiliated with Tribhuvan University (TU)

Universities and colleges in Nepal